Bērziņš (Old orthography: Be(h)rsin(g); feminine: Bērziņa) is the most common Latvian surname, derived from the Latvian word for "birch tree". Individuals with the surname include:

Aldis Berzins (born 1956), volleyball player
Alfons Bērziņš (1916–1987), long track speed skater
Andris Bērziņš (born 1944), politician and businessman, former President of Latvia (2011-2015)
Andris Bērziņš (born 1951), politician
Armands Bērziņš (born 1983), ice hockey player
Artūrs Bērziņš (born 1988), basketball player
Augusts Miervaldis Bērziņš (1921–2000), writer, publicist and physician
Gundars Bērziņš (born 1959), politician
Ilze Bērziņa (born 1984), chess player
Ingrīda Bērziņa (born 1954), chess player
Jānis Bērziņš (1880s–1938),  military official and politician
Jānis Bērziņš (born 1984), biathlete
Jānis Bērziņš (born 1993), basketball player
Jānis Bērziņš (1881–1938), diplomat
John Bērziņš (born 1957), bishop of Caracas and South America
Juris Bērziņš (born 1954), rower
Kaspars Bērziņš (born 1985), basketball player
Laila Bērziņa (born 1965), Latvian politician
Lauris Bērziņš, luger
Māris Bērziņš (born 1962), writer and playwright
Reinholds Bērziņš (1888-1938) Soviet politician and military officer, executed during the "Latvian Operation"
Sandris Bērziņš (born 1976), luger
Uldis Bērziņš (1944–2021), poet and translator
Vladimirs Bērziņš (1905–?), football player and manager

See also
Berzin

References

Latvian-language masculine surnames